Agallissus lepturoides is a species of longhorn beetle in the Cerambycinae subfamily. It was described by Chevrolat in 1844. It is known from Texas, USA, Mexico and Honduras.

References

Agallissini
Beetles described in 1844